Round Table is a  Japanese pop band known mostly for their anime soundtracks. They are most popularly known in the Anime demographic for their hit single, "Let Me Be With You" - the opening song for the anime Chobits. The band was formed in 1997 with Katsutoshi Kitagawa (vocals, guitar, and bass guitar) and Rieko Ito (vocals and keyboard) as band members. In 2002, Nino joined as a guest vocalist. Nino provides the main vocals for the songs while Kitagawa provides backing vocals. Since then their songs have often been credited as "ROUND TABLE featuring Nino". The name of the album April came from Nino's birth-month.

Discography (Round Table)

Singles

29 June 1998: Big Wave '71 - EP
Ride on the Big Wave
Get on the Bicycle!
Exotic Ooh-Room
In the Season
Wild Chocolate Brothers

30 September 1998: Do The Afro!
Chocolate
Glass Green Polka
Do the Afro
One Day in the September
Little Brownie's Theme

27 January 1999: Cool Club Rule
Cool Club Rule
Domino Time Rag
Viva!Brownie

27 October 1999: Perfect World
Perfect World
Glad to Be Unhappy
Do It Again

6 December 2000: Every Every Every
Every Every Every
Radio Burnin'
All the Way Down

22 Jan 2021: アイリス'(Iris)
アイリス feat. Uruha Rushia

Albums

27 August 1997: World's End
Repeat after me
Windy
World's End
So Little Time
Mexican Drag Race
Arifureta Ichinichi (ありふれた1日)
One More Time!!

5 December 1997: Something in the Snow
Light a Candle
Tiny Adventure
Everybody's Talkin'
Radio Time a GO-GO!!
Up to Wednesday, 3p.m.
Revenge of the Radio Time
Picnic
Make a Wish, Blow Out a Candle

1 April 1998: Feelin' Groovy
How Do You Feel?
Feelin' Groovy
Don't Ask Me Why
Stillness
Highway 69
Mad Engine joe
Beat De Jump
Doo-Wop Feelin'

27 January 1999: Domino
Domino
Brownie
Cool Club Rule
Holiday
Play the March
Summer Rain
Battle Cop B.B.
Desert Side of the Moon
Ring a Bell
Christmas Time
Domino Again
Everything You Know

7 July 1999: Big Wave '72
Here Comes the Big Wave
Holiday (Mix '72)
One Little Cowboy
Let's Go to the Beach!
Jazz On a Holiday
Ukulele to the Beach
You Baby
Sunset Holiday
End Theme
Big Wave '71（Reprise）

8 December 1999: Cannon Ball
Mr. Cannonballer
Perfect World
Moon Light
Everlasting Daydream
It's O.K.? Mr. No.1
Bamallama Baby
Mr. Cannonballer Strikes Back
FLY
Timeless
So Many Colors
Brand New Car
Say Goodbye

29 March 2000: Look Around (Greatest Hits Album)
Introduction
Chocolate
Cool Club Rule
Holiday （Mix '72）
World's End
Back on My Feet Again
Theme from Look Around
Radio Time a Go-Go!!
Brownie
Get on the Bicycle!
Windy
Beat De Jump
Picnic
It's a Sunshine Day - cover of the Brady Bunch song
Feelin' Groovy
Look Around Bossa

12 July 2000: Big Wave 2000 - EP
Viva! Samba Parade
Big Wave
Let's Go to the Beach! （Copacabana Mix）
Big Wave 2・0・0・0
Tiny Adventure （Cool Summer Mix）
Find Your Step!
Boys Don't Cry - cover of original by The Cure
Corcovado
Viva! Samba Carnival

31 January 2001: RADIO BURNIN'
Come On! Come On!
Every Every Every （Radio Radio Radio Mix）
Goin' to the Radio Show
Radio Time #1
Hello! It's You
No No - Yeah Yeah
Baby Baby
Radio Is Burning
Radio Time #2
Everyday
Across the Highway
1,2,3 for Jump
No Reaction
You Are No.1
Good Night Rosie
Come On! Come On! （Reprise）

25 August 2003: Big Wave Sunset
Opening
Big Wave Sunset
Let Me
Bossa Rie
Youngmen Blues
Life
In the Rain
Tell Me Why

1 April 2009: Friday I'm in Love
Try a Little Happiness
My Girl
Under the Moonlight
Tooi Machikado (遠い街角)
Faraway
Friday Night
Summer Days
Nari Hibiku Kane (鳴り響く鐘)
Ai no Yukue (愛の行方)
Dancin' All Night
Let's Stay Together
Dance with Me

Discography (Round Table featuring Nino)

Singles

24 April 2002: Let Me Be with You - Chobits
Let Me Be with You
Book End Bossa
Let Me Be with You （Instrumental）

22 January 2003: New World - .hack//Legend of the Twilight
New World
Beautiful
New World （Instrumental）

22 October 2003: Sunny Side Hill - Uninhabited Planet Survive!
Sunny Side Hill
Message
Sunny Side Hill （Instrumental）
Message （Instrumental）

23 February 2005: Groovin' Magic - Gunbuster 2
Groovin' Magic
Stay with Me
Groovin' Magic （Instrumental）

21 October 2005: Rainbow - ARIA The ANIMATION
Rainbow
Just for You
Rainbow （Instrumental）
Just for You （Instrumental）

26 April 2006: Natsu Machi (夏待ち) - ARIA The NATURAL
Natsu Machi (夏待ち)
Shiosai (潮騒)
Natsu Machi (夏待ち) （Instrumental）
Shiosai (潮騒) （Instrumental）

20 July 2006: Puzzle (パズル) - Welcome to the N.H.K.
Puzzle (パズル)
Atashi Datte Onaji Koto Omotteruyo (あたしだって同じこと思ってるよ)
Puzzle (パズル) （Instrumental)
Atashi Datte Onaji Koto Omotteruyo (あたしだって同じこと思ってるよ) （Instrumental）

25 June 2008: Koi wo Shiteru (恋をしてる) - TV Tokyo Webtama 3
Koi wo Shiteru (恋をしてる)
Symphony (シンフォニー)
Takaramono -homemade demo ver.- (宝物－homemade demo ver.－)
Koi wo Shiteru (恋をしてる) －without Nino－
Symphony (シンフォニー) －without Nino－

22 October 2008: Nagareboshi (ナガレボシ) - Yozakura Quartet
Nagareboshi (ナガレボシ)
Akaneiro Sentimental (茜色センチメンタル)
Inori (祈り)
Nagareboshi (ナガレボシ) －without Nino－
Akaneiro Sentimental (茜色センチメンタル) －without Nino－

Albums
23 April 2003: April
Let Me Be with You
Dancin' All Night
Beautiful
New World
Day By Day
Birthday
Book End Bossa
Where Is Love
Today
In April
Love Me Baby
Let Me Be with You （New Step Mix）

30 August 2006: Nino
Be Your Girl
Groovin' Magic
Puzzle ~Extra Hot Mix~ (パズル ~Extra Hot Mix~）
Natsu Machi (夏待ち)
Message
Just for You
Shiosai (潮騒)
Hello Goodbye (ハローグッバイ)
Sunny Side Hill
Stay with Me
Rainbow
Just a Little

24 December 2008: Distance
Long Distance
Koi wo Shiteru (恋をしてる)
Sayonara
Atashi Datte Onaji Koto Omotteru yo (あたしだって同じこと思ってるよ)
Sunny Day
Toki wo Koete (時を越えて)
Nemurenai Yoru (眠れない夜)
Akane Iro Sentimental (茜色センチメンタル)
Oh! Yeah! -New Year's Mix-
Futsuu no Koto (普通の事)
Nagareboshi (ナガレボシ)
Yokogao (横顔)
Takaramono (宝物)
Long Distance -reprise-

28 November 2012: Singles Best 2002-2012 Memories
Let Me Be With You
New World
Sunny Side Hill
Groovin' Magic
Rainbow
Natsu Machi (夏待ち)
Puzzle (パズル)
Oh! Yeah!! -New Year's Mix-
Koi wo Shiteru (恋をしてる)
Symphony (シンフォニー)
Nagareboshi (ナガレボシ)
Himawari
Yakusoku no Basho
Memories

Special
In 2007, they created a song that ran in the credits of CLAMP in Wonderland 2. It was included on the soundtrack.
24 October 2007: CLAMP IN WONDERLAND1&2 (PRECIOUS SONGS) - CLAMP in Wonderland
 action! - 坂本真綾
 Oh! Yeah!! - ROUND TABLE Feat. Nino
 あなただけのWONDERLAND - 広谷順子
 「あなた」が「しあわせ」であるように - 広谷順子
 action! －without 坂本真綾－
 Oh! Yeah!! －without Nino－

External links
 Official website
 Round Table featuring Nino, on Victor Entertainment's website
 
 

Anime musical groups
Japanese pop music groups
Musical groups established in 1997